Astragalus macrobotrys is a species of milkvetch in the family Fabaceae.

References

macrobotrys
Taxa named by Alexander von Bunge